is the tenth single by Japanese idol group Cute. It was released on September 16, 2009, in both normal and limited editions, the latter of the two containing a DVD. The first editions of both normal and limited contained a card with a serial number on it, used in a draw as a promotional event. Maimi Yajima and Airi Suzuki were the lead vocalists, and the song peaked at number 2 on the Oricon weekly chart, making number 1 on the daily chart (on September 19). This was also the final single to feature Erika Umeda, before her graduation.

Track listing

Charts

References

External links
Everyday Zekkōchō!! at the UP-FRONT WORKS discography (Japanese)
Everyday Zekkōchō!! at the Hello! Project official discography (Japanese)

2009 singles
Japanese-language songs
Cute (Japanese idol group) songs
Songs written by Tsunku
Song recordings produced by Tsunku
Zetima Records singles
2009 songs